Arnold Joseph "Jug" Thesenga (April 27, 1914 – December 3, 2002) was a Major League Baseball pitcher who appeared in five games for the Washington Senators in .

Sources

Major League Baseball pitchers
Washington Senators (1901–1960) players
Sioux City Cowboys players
Waterloo Red Hawks players
Durham Bulls players
Tyler Trojans players
Baseball players from South Dakota
People from Union County, South Dakota
1914 births
2002 deaths